Attitude Baptist Church, officially known as Central Barra Baptist Church is a Baptist megachurch originating from Rio de Janeiro, Brazil affiliated with the Brazilian Baptist Convention. Josué Vallandro Jr. is its current Pastor-President leading approximately 13,500 members.

History
Attitude Baptist Church started as a Community Mission in the neighbourhood of Itanhangá, Rio de Janeiro by the Southern Baptist International Mission Board missionary Edgar F. Hallock, Jr. Initially the Mission met in a rented room of a University nearby and later at a public school. On June 4, 2000, sponsored by the First Baptist Church in Barra, the Mission was organized as the Central Barra Baptist Church with 32 members.

Organisation
Attitude Baptist was modeled after the successful experiences of Saddleback, Hillsong and Santarém-Paz Churches. Works and experiences of pastors Abe Hubner and Rick Warren serve as main inspiration.

The Church is organized in 15 congregations and apprimatelly 1.200 cells, which replicate the general Cell church structure of the Main Church in Barra da Tijuca. According to this model the basic structure is the Cell group, which generally has up to 12 people and often cell-members also have the role of counselor and counselee. Upon exceeding this 12-person limit, the cell multiplies into new cells. Each cell is under the care of a Cell-leader. Every cell is integrated into a network of cells under the care of a Cell-supervisor, to whom Cell-leaders report. Cell supervisors in turn report to the pastor of the church, who in turn report to the Pastor-president. Because of its size, the main Church has more hierarchical levels.

The work of each church is conducted voluntarily by church members and it is organized into Ministries. Ministries are: 
  for Children;
  for Adolescents;
  for Youth; 
  for Women;
  for Men;
  for Brazilian Sign Language interpretation.
  devoted to the Community in general;
  for Biblical and Theological Education;
  for Outreach.
There are also supporting ministries such as Counseling, Reception, Intercession, Worship and Broadcasting.

Congregations and Leadership
Since September 27, 2003 the Church is led by its pastor-president, Josué Valandro de Oliveira Jr., and each of its daughter-churches is led by a pastor.

The Church meets regularly in 13 congregations in 4 different Brazilian States, 1 in the United States and 1 in Canada. They are:

a. Predecessor: Pr. Achilles Schachter between July 26, 2019 and March, 2020. 
b. Predecessor: Pr. Edgar F. Hallock, Jr. between June 4, 2000 and June 8, 2001.
c. Predecessor: Pr. Leandro Barros between February 5, 2017 and August 10, 2020.

Media
Attitude Baptist has a weekly program called Attitude Time broadcast on Saturday mornings at 10:30AM by RedeTV!. Worships and some activities are broadcast in social media such as Facebook, Youtube and Instagram.

Public Exposure
One of the most well-known members of Attitude Baptist Church is the current First Lady of Brazil Michelle Bolsonaro, formerly an interpreter and member of the Church Ministry in Brazilian Sign Language. Together with his wife, the current President of Brazil Jair Bolsonaro has attended services in Barra da Tijuca.

Gallery

See also

References

Protestantism in Brazil
Baptist Christianity in Brazil
Baptist churches in Brazil
Evangelical megachurches in Brazil